The bridge is significant locally as the only Pratt through-truss bridge remaining in Kosciusko County, and is important regionally as one of the few surviving spans built by the Bellefontaine Bridge and Iron Company.

Just west of the bridge was a ford across the Tippecanoe River.  The Yellowstone Trail passed on the south side of the river.  A marker has been maintained at this location consisting of a post with yellows bands and a "Y" in a black circle. In 1884, a new bridge across the Tippecanoe River was requested to connect Warsaw, on the south with Atwood and Etna Green on the north. It crossed the property of Robert Chinworth. Capt. David Braden working for the Bellefontaine Bridge and Iron Company agreed to erect a  span over the Tippecanoe River, at a total cost of $2520.00. The bridge opened in August, 1897. In 1924, with the construction of U.S. 30 the Chinworth Bridge was bypassed as it could not handle modern vehicular traffic. The Indiana State Highway Commission, created Tippecanoe Rest Area adjacent to the Chinworth Bridge.

In 1975, the enhanced 4-lane U.S. 30 was located north of the Chinworth Bridge.  The bridge was closed to all vehicular traffic at that time.  In July the Kosciusko County Historical Society obtained the Tippecanoe Rest Park from the State Highway Department. The KCHS dedicated the bridge as a historic landmark on July 6, 1975.

Description
The Chinworth Bridge was built by the Bellefontaine Bridge and Iron Company of Bellefontaine, Ohio. It is a  Pratt through-truss. The southern abutment has been altered over the years.

Diagonals are designed for tension with greater stress expected toward the span's end. A single counterbrace in the third panel and a pair in the fourth, each of  round rods with turnbuckles.

Bracing at the upper chord and at the lower chord adds strength. To protect against swaying, a round iron rod runs diagonally from one truss to the other.

I-floor beams carry the span's deck. Sets of stringers carry the  timber running surface. The timbers were covered in 1927 by a bituminous coating. A latticed guardrail runs the length of each side of the deck.

Significance
Chinworth Bridge is an example of a Pratt through-truss bridge. Patented in 1844 Caleb and Thomas Pratt, the truss has vertical elements acting in compression and diagonal components acting in tension. A pin-connected Pratt through truss is "representative of perhaps the most common type of early-20th century truss bridges."

Bibliography
Comp, T. Allan and Donald Jackson. "Bridge Truss Types: a guide to dating and identifying."
American Association for State and Local History Technical Leaflet 95, History News. Vol 32, No. 5, May, 1977.
Cooper, James L. Iron Monuments to Distant Posterity: Indiana's Metal Bridges. 1870-1950. Indianapolis: Technical Publishing Services, 1987.
Cooper, James L. "Orion and the Chinworth Bridge." 1996.
Jackson, Donald C. "Great American Bridges and Dams." A National Trust Guide, Great American Places Series, The Preservation Press.
Preservation Information. Preserving Historic Bridges. National Trust for Historic Preservation.

See also
Kosciusko County Jail
Warsaw Courthouse Square Historic District
Winona Lake Historic District

References

Road bridges on the National Register of Historic Places in Indiana
Bridges completed in 1897
Transportation buildings and structures in Kosciusko County, Indiana
National Register of Historic Places in Kosciusko County, Indiana
1897 establishments in Indiana
Lincoln Highway
Iron bridges in the United States
Pratt truss bridges in the United States